Kedar Hemant Devdhar (born 14 December 1989) is an Indian cricketer. He is a wicketkeeper-batsman who currently plays in Indian domestic cricket for Baroda. He was also a part of the now defunct Deccan Chargers in the Indian Premier League. In January 2018, he scored his first century in Twenty20 cricket, scoring 100 for Baroda against Gujarat in the 2017–18 Zonal T20 League.

References

External links 

1989 births
Living people
People from Gujarat
Indian cricketers
Baroda cricketers
Deccan Chargers cricketers
West Zone cricketers
Gujarati people
People from Vadodara
Wicket-keepers